St. Luke's School is a private, secular, co-educational day school founded in 1928 and situated on a  campus in New Canaan, Connecticut. St. Luke's offers a college-preparatory curriculum for grades 5 through 12, with a diverse student body of 594 from 30 towns in Connecticut and New York.

St. Luke's operates radio station WSLX (91.9 FM).

Notable alumni
 Paul Dalio (born 1979), screenwriter, director and composer
 John Henson, actor, comedian and TV host
 Brown Meggs, music industry executive, novelist. Signed the Beatles to Capitol Records in 1963
 Olivia Palermo, socialite from The City
 Zachary Cole Smith and Andrew Bailey of DIIV
Noel Thomas Jr., wide receiver of Ottawa Redblacks
Cameron Wilson, professional golfer

References

External links
 

Buildings and structures in New Canaan, Connecticut
Schools in Fairfield County, Connecticut
Educational institutions established in 1928
1928 establishments in Connecticut
Private high schools in Connecticut
Private middle schools in Connecticut
Private elementary schools in Connecticut